Mineral County Courthouse is a historic courthouse located at Keyser, Mineral County, West Virginia.  It was built in 1868 and expanded or remodeled in 1894 and 1938–1941.  The original section of the courthouse is a 2 1/2 story, brick building. The 1894 modifications are in the Romanesque Revival style.  It is a three-story section constructed of brick and rusticated stone, with a low-pitched hipped roof.  It features a centered tower topped with a pyramidal roof. The side and rear, two-story additions were constructed in 1938 and 1941 to provide additional county office space. U.S. Senator and vice presidential candidate Henry G. Davis donated land for the courthouse square.

It was listed on the National Register of Historic Places in 2005.

References

Courthouses on the National Register of Historic Places in West Virginia
Government buildings completed in 1868
Romanesque Revival architecture in West Virginia
Buildings and structures in Mineral County, West Virginia
National Register of Historic Places in Mineral County, West Virginia
1868 establishments in West Virginia